Chinalingaya Palem is a Panchayat in Kakumanu Mandal, Guntur District of Andhra Pradesh. It is an Agricultural Village with a population of nearly 1600.

Geography

Chinalingaya Palem is surrounded by the following villages: Valluru, Kondabala Vari Palem and Pandrapadu.

Villages in Guntur district